Thomas Provis Wickham (born 1810 in Weymouth, Dorset; died on 1 March 1890 in Machynlleth), probably best known as an English cricketer.

Personal life
Wickham was the son of the reverend William Wickham and Margaret Provis, and brother of the reverend William Provis Trelawney Wickham (Rector of Shepton Mallet, the building of the Wickham Almshouses by his widow, was made possible by a bequest from his will). He had two sisters, Annabella (who married James Bennett, Sheriff of Somerset) and Caroline.

According to Bernard Burke the Wickhams (of Horsington) were an ancient Somerset family, belonging to the landed gentry.

In 1835 he married Sarah Hussey.

Little is known about him other than that he was a "gentleman". It is suggested that he spent some time in a debtors' prison.

Cricket
Wickham made his first-class debut and his only appearance for Hampshire against an All-England Eleven in 1850. 
In 1851, Wickham made his last first class appearance for the Marylebone Cricket Club against Cambridge University.

References

External links
Thomas Wickham at Cricinfo
Thomas Wickham at CricketArchive

1810 births
1890 deaths
Sportspeople from Weymouth
Cricketers from Dorset
English cricketers
Hampshire cricketers
Marylebone Cricket Club cricketers